Lang'ata Constituency is an electoral constituency in Nairobi City County. It is one of the seventeen constituencies in the county. It consists of southern and southwestern areas of Nairobi. Langata constituency had common boundaries with a now defunct Kibera Division of Nairobi. It was known as Nairobi South Constituency at the 1963 elections but since 1969 elections it has been known as Lang'ata Constituency.

Kibera, Kenya's largest slum, borders Lang'ata Constituency, and was part of it before the creation of Kibra Constituency by the Independent Electoral and Boundaries Commission; though there is a smaller portion of the slum that is still part of Lang'ata Constituency.

The affluent suburb of Karen and the mainly middle class Lang'ata suburb are part of Langata Constituency, along with the Nairobi National Park and Lang'ata Barracks, which housed the King's African Rifles during British colonial rule.

Members of Parliament 
Lang'ata Constituency is represented by Felix Odiwour, following the Kenyan general election of 2022. Before this, the constituency was represented in Parliament by Nixon Korir. The first Langata MP Joseph Murumbi  served as a Vice-President of Kenya from 1966 to 1967. Former Langata MP Philip Leakey was the first white Kenyan MP.

Another noteworthy former Langata MP is Mwangi Mathai, the former husband of Nobel Peace Prize laureate Wangari Maathai.

Wards 
Lang'ata Constituency is divided into five wards, each of which elects a representative to the Nairobi County Assembly.

Lang'ata Sub-county
The Sub-county shares the same boundaries with the constituency. The Sub-county is headed by the sub-county administrator, appointed by a County Public Service Board.

References

External links 
Map of the constituency
Uchaguzikenya.com - Constituency profile
Social audit of the constituency

Constituencies in Nairobi
1963 establishments in Kenya
Constituencies established in 1963